C-16: FBI (originally broadcast as C-16) is an American crime drama series that aired on ABC from September 27, 1997 until July 2, 1998.

Premise 
C-16 referred to a special unit of the Federal Bureau of Investigation (FBI) that was assigned to the most difficult cases. The unit, based in Los Angeles, was hand-picked by SAC John Olansky (Eric Roberts).

Characters 
John Olansky, SAC (Eric Roberts)
Special Agent Amanda Reardon (Angie Harmon)
Special Agent Anne Rooney (Christine Tucci)
Special Agent Scott Stoddard (D. B. Sweeney)
Special Agent Jack DiRado (Zach Grenier)
Special Agent Dennis Grassi (Michael Cavanaugh)
Special Agent Mal Robinson (Morris Chestnut)

Episodes

Citations

General and cited sources 
 Terrace, Vincent. "C-16: FBI" in Encyclopedia of Television Shows, 1925 Through 2007. Jefferson, North Carolina: McFarland & Co., 2008.

External links
 

1990s American crime drama television series
1997 American television series debuts
1998 American television series endings
Television shows set in Los Angeles
English-language television shows
American Broadcasting Company original programming
Serial drama television series
Television shows filmed in Los Angeles
Television series by Disney–ABC Domestic Television